David Edgerton FBA (born 16 April 1959) is an English historian and educator. He was educated at St John's College, Oxford, and Imperial College London. After teaching the economics of science and technology and the history of science and technology at the University of Manchester, he became the founding director of the Centre for the History of Science, Technology and Medicine at Imperial College, London, and Hans Rausing Professor. He has held a Major Research Fellowship (2006–2009) from the Leverhulme Trust. In 2013, he led the move of the Centre for the History of Science, Technology and Medicine to the Department of History of King's College London.

Edgerton's books include Warfare State: Britain 1920–1970 (Cambridge, 2005) and The Shock of the Old: Technology and Global History since 1900 (Profile, 2006).

Edgerton was elected a fellow of the British Academy in 2021.

Selected publications
David Edgerton has published both articles and several books, including:
 The Rise and Fall of the British Nation: A Twentieth-Century History (2018) 
 Britain's War Machine: Weapons, Resources and Experts in the Second World War (2011) 
 Warfare State: Britain 1920–1970 (Cambridge, 2005); 
 The Shock of the Old: Technology and Global History since 1900 (Profile, 2006) 
 Science, Technology and the British Industrial 'Decline''' 1870–1970 
 England and the Aeroplane: An Essay on a Militant and Technological Nation (Science, Technology and Medicine in Modern History)'' (1991)

References

External links
 King's College London

English historians
Historians of science
Historians of technology
1959 births
Living people
Alumni of St John's College, Oxford
People from Montevideo
Academics of Imperial College London
Academics of King's College London
Fellows of the British Academy